Xu Jun (born September 17, 1962) is a Chinese chess player. He was awarded the title of Grandmaster by FIDE in 1994, becoming the fourth from China.

Born in Suzhou, Jiangsu,  Xu was champion of China in 1983 and 1985. He has been a member of the Chinese Olympiad team, a five times winner of the Asia Team Championship (1983–2003), the 1987 3.3 Zonal champion, the 1998 champion of China Open; the 2000–2001 champion of Asia, and was a 2002 Chess Olympiad member of Chinese team which came 5th in the final standings.

In 2012, he was awarded the title of FIDE Senior Trainer.

China Chess League
Xu Jun plays for Jiangsu chess club in the China Chess League (CCL).

References

External links
 
 
 
 

1962 births
Living people
Chess grandmasters
Chess Olympiad competitors
Chess players from Jiangsu
Sportspeople from Suzhou